The Fairbanks Arts Association is a non-profit organization established in 1966 to promote excellence in contemporary and traditional Alaskan arts in Interior Alaska.  It is the oldest community arts council in Alaska as well as serving as the official arts organization for both the Fairbanks North Star Borough and the City of Fairbanks, Alaska.  The main office is located in the Alaska Centennial Center for Arts in Pioneer Park.

The Fairbanks Arts Association provides services to local artists and arts organizations.  Volunteers serve on standing committees of the Board, and help to steer the course of programming in performance, literary, visual, community, and educational arts. The association has developed educational programs to improve the climate for the arts in Interior Alaska.

They have a number of educational programs. One of these is the Artists-in-Schools  program within the FNSBSD. The AIS residence enables artists to study traditional and contemporary art forms that include music, dance, traditional Alaska Native art, digital arts and more.

They also have a program called the Very Special Arts (VSA) program.  This is a day when special education students come to Pioneer Park for a hands-on art experience.

References

External links
 Official Website

Culture of Fairbanks, Alaska
Arts councils of the United States
Arts organizations established in 1966
Non-profit organizations based in Fairbanks, Alaska
1966 establishments in Alaska